Nicholas David Mrozinski, formerly known as Nick "The Feelin'" Mrozinski,  (born August 14, 1980) is an American soul singer-songwriter based in St. Paul, Minnesota.  He was a finalist on the third season of NBC’s The Voice.  Performed at Greeley Blues Jam 2018 with the Devon Allman Project

Early life 
Nicholas David Mrozinski was born in Minneapolis, Minnesota on August 14, 1980. He attended St. Joseph’s Catholic School in Rosemount, Minnesota from 1986-1995 (kindergarten-8th grade), and Eagan High School.  He began piano lessons in the second grade, voice lessons in tenth grade, and sang and listened to classical and jazz music.  He learned to play by ear and as a teenager would often play for his mother before going to bed. His grandfather was also an accomplished musician who plays the accordion.

Music career 
David began his recording career in 2004 with the release "Four Legged Light", a solo acoustic album produced under his own Label, Wake the World. He would go on to record four more albums/EPs under that label.  From 2007-2012 he would play four or five gigs a week around the Twin Cities area.

The Voice
In 2012, David auditioned for the third season of The Voice. He won a spot on Cee Lo Green's team, where he was dubbed "St. Nick".  One of his signature performances was singing "You Are So Beautiful" to his pregnant wife, where both he and coach Cee Lo Green teared up.  On early episodes of the show David opened up about his struggles with sobriety, weight gain, and his spirituality.

Performances on The Voice

After The Voice
After appearing on The Voice, David began work on his sixth album. He plans to continue writing music and recording in his home state of Minnesota.

Discography

Studio albums
David has completed six studio albums as well as one compilation album, The Minnesota Beatle Project, which was named "Best Local Compilation CD" by the City Pages. David's "Say Goodbye" debuted at #44 on the Billboard to 200 charts  and charted for a couple weeks on the alternative charts.

References

External links

 Documentary Short of Nicholas David at YouTube

1980 births
21st-century American singers
American soul singers
Singers from Minnesota
The Voice (franchise) contestants
Living people
21st-century American male singers